Remainder is the amount "left over" when dividing two integers.

Remainder may also refer to:

Remaindered book, a publisher liquidating the remaining unsold copies of a book
Remainder (law), in property law, a future interest created in a transferee
Remainder term, in mathematics, when approximating a value by a series, is the error (the amount "left over") of an approximation, such that true value = series approximation + remainder term
Remainder (novel), a novel by Tom McCarthy
Remainder (film), a 2015 British film, based on the novel
 In remainder, relative to an aristocratic title, is being capable of inheriting it.